The USS Stranger was a yacht built in 1880 by William Cramp & Sons and acquired in 1898 by the US Navy for use in the Spanish–American War. It was commissioned on June 30, 1898 and saw service in the West Indian Blocking Squadron off of Havana, Cuba.

Placed out of commission from September 24 to December 6, 1898 at the Norfolk Naval Yard, she was overhauled and refitted for service with the Louisiana Naval Militia for use in training. She was officially turned over to the Militia on November 16, 1898.

The ship served with the militia until the middle of October 1915, when she was sunk during a hurricane in New Orleans.

Commanders
 1898 George Leland Dyer

References

Stranger
Gunboats of the United States Navy
Spanish–American War gunboats of the United States
1898 ships
Maritime incidents in 1915
Shipwrecks of the Louisiana coast
Ships built by William Cramp & Sons